Ernolatia lida is a moth in the Bombycidae family. It is found from Malaysia to Sulawesi.

The moth is 26–44 mm. The ground colour is cream with bright red-brown markings.

The larvae feed on Ficus elastica, Ficus benjamina and Ficus septica.

References

Natural History Museum Lepidoptera generic names catalog

Bombycidae